Emad Mohamed Abdelnaby Ibrahim Moteab (born 20 February 1983) is an Egyptian semi-retired professional footballer who played as a striker.

Career statistics

International
Source:

International goals
Scores and results list Egypt's goal tally first.

Honours and achievements

Al Ahly
Egyptian Premier League: 2004–05, 2005–06, 2006–07, 2007–08, 2009–10, 2010–11, 2013–14, 2015–16, 2016–17, 2017–18
Egypt Cup: 2006, 2007, 2016–17
Egyptian Super Cup: 2005, 2006, 2007, 2012, 2014, 2015
CAF Champions League: 2005, 2006, 2008, 2012, 2013
CAF Confederation Cup: 2014
CAF Super Cup: 2006, 2007, 2013, 2014

Al-Ittihad
Saudi Professional League: 2008–09

Egypt U20
African Youth Championship: 2003

Egypt
African Cup of Nations: 2006, 2008, 2010

References

External links

1983 births
Living people
Egyptian footballers
Egypt international footballers
2006 Africa Cup of Nations players
2008 Africa Cup of Nations players
2010 Africa Cup of Nations players
Al Ahly SC players
Association football forwards
Ittihad FC players
People from Sharqia Governorate
Olympic footballers of Egypt
Footballers at the 2012 Summer Olympics
Egyptian Premier League players
Al-Taawoun FC players
Saudi Professional League players
Expatriate footballers in Saudi Arabia
Egyptian expatriate sportspeople in Saudi Arabia
Egyptian expatriate footballers